Santa Cruz Games was an American independent video game developer founded in 2001 in Santa Cruz, California, USA.

Published games
 2008: The Amazing Spider-Man and the Masked Menace for Jakks Pacific (Plug It In And Play TV Game)
 2008: Tomb Raider: Underworld for Nintendo DS
 2007: Godzilla Unleashed: Double Smash for DS
 2006: Superman Returns for DS, GBA (Electronic Arts)
 2005: Madagascar Island Mania for Microsoft Windows
 2005: Fantastic 4 for Jakks Pacific (Plug It In And Play TV Game)
 2004: Spider-Man for Jakks Pacific (Plug It In And Play TV Game)
 2004: Shark Tale for Windows
 2003: 101 Dalmatians II: Patch's London Adventure for PSone
 2003: Dora the Explorer: Barnyard Buddies for PSone
 2002: Shaun Murray's Pro WakeBoarder for Game Cube
 2001: E.T.: Interplanetary Mission for PSone

External links
 Official Santa Cruz Games website
 Santa Cruz Games company profile from MobyGames

Video game development companies
Video game companies established in 2001
Video game companies disestablished in 2009
Defunct companies based in California
Defunct video game companies of the United States
Companies based in Santa Cruz County, California
2001 establishments in California
2009 disestablishments in California